Neurotrophin-4 (NT-4), also known as neurotrophin-5 (NT-5), is a protein that in humans is encoded by the NTF4 gene. It is a neurotrophic factor that signals predominantly through the TrkB receptor tyrosine kinase.

See also
 Tropomyosin receptor kinase B § Agonists

References

Further reading

External links
 
 

Neurotrophic factors
Peptide hormones
Growth factors
Developmental neuroscience
Proteins
TrkB agonists